Senator Cone may refer to:

Francis H. Cone (1797–1859), Georgia State Senate
Fred P. Cone (1871–1948), Florida State Senate